The Waterloo Central Railway (WCR) is a non-profit heritage railway owned and operated by the Southern Ontario Locomotive Restoration Society (SOLRS). In May 2007, SOLRS received joint approval from the Region of Waterloo and the City of Waterloo to run trains from Waterloo to St Jacobs and potentially as far north as Elmira. On a typical operating day, the train runs three times a day on Tuesdays (June to August), Thursdays (May to October) and Saturday (April to October). In 2015, the railway lost regular running rights south of Northfield Drive to make way for the Ion light rail project. All Market Train service now runs between St. Jacobs Farmers' Market, the Village of St. Jacobs, and Elmira, Ontario. 

The train also runs on certain special events including the Maple Syrup Festival in early April.

Operations and milestones

Running rights 
The WCR operates on the former Canadian National Waterloo Spur now owned by the Region of Waterloo, which connects Elmira, St. Jacobs and Waterloo to  Kitchener, Ontario by rail. Through an agreement with the Region of Waterloo, the WCR operates passenger service in daytime hours, and the Goderich–Exeter Railway operates freight service in evening hours. From 2007 to 2014, the WCR leased space in the City of Waterloo Visitor and Heritage Information Centre which was formerly owned by the Waterloo-St. Jacobs Railway. As of 2015, the WCR no longer operates south of Northfield Drive.

Before 2007
The Waterloo-St. Jacobs Railway operated on the Waterloo Spur between 1997 and 2000. When it ceased operations, the Region of Waterloo purchased the railway right-of-way and the City of Waterloo acquired the railway's modern Waterloo station. SOLRS operated on the line briefly in 2003 as part of a province-wide steam tour in Ontario.

2007 to 2014
The inaugural season began in 2007 with diesel-hauled service serving Waterloo, the St. Jacobs Market and the Village of St. Jacobs on Market Days. exEssex Terminal Railway Steam Engine Number 9 was moved along with most of the SOLRS equipment from St. Thomas to Waterloo Region in the fall. Santa Claus trains begin this season as well. The 2008 season added annual excursions to service the Elmira Maple Syrup Festival. In 2010 a restoration and service shop in St. Jacobs allowed for the reactivation of the restoration programme. Ex. ETR #9 was stored under cover for the first time since it arrived from St. Thomas. Ex. CN 79482 caboose was restored as WCR 482 and returned to service. Ex. CNR 50845  Burro Crane and steam locomotive 124 were relocated to St. Jacobs.

The final train departed from the Waterloo station on Sunday, December 14, 2014.  No further services will depart from the Waterloo station.

2015 and beyond

In 2015, the St. Jacobs Farmers Market Station became the main departure point for all future Market Train departures. The 2017 season began with an excursion to the Elmira Maple Syrup Festival departing from the St. Jacobs Farmers Market station on 1 April 2017.  

The Southern Ontario Locomotive Restoration Society also runs a Rail School to teach people certain aspects of train operation. On completion of the full hours of training, graduates can receive Ministry of Transportation Certification as Engineer, Conductor, or Safety Crew.

As of the 2018 season, the railway's southern terminus is Northfield Drive in Waterloo, just north of the Ion system's Northfield station.

Southern Ontario Locomotive Restoration Society 
The Southern Ontario Locomotive Restoration Society (SOLRS) is the parent organization that operates the Waterloo Central Railway. SOLRS became a registered Canadian charity in 1988 and maintains that status today. The mandate of SOLRS is to preserve, to restore and to operate vintage railway equipment for the education and enjoyment of the public and to present the cultural heritage in a new and more meaningful way to generations past, present and future.

Equipment

Motive power
 Engine 1001, a diesel-powered MLW S-13 locomotive built in 1959 for the Pacific Great Eastern Railway as 1001. In regular active service.
 Engine 1002, a diesel-powered MLW S-13 locomotive built in 1959 for the Pacific Great Eastern Railway as 1002. In regular active service.
 Engine 1437, a diesel-powered GMD GMD1 locomotive built in 1958 for the Canadian National Railway as 1012. In operating status. 
 Engine 9, former Essex Terminal Railway steam locomotive Number 9, a 0-6-0 switcher built in 1923 at Montreal Locomotive Works. In occasional service.
 Engine 6593, a diesel-powered MLW 105 ton S-3 locomotive built in 1957 for the Canadian Pacific Railway as 6593. It is in active service.
 Steam Engine 124. Under active restoration.

Rolling stock
SOLRS has a variety of heritage cars in active service and others that await restoration. When SOLRS takes extended tours, they also bring a baggage car, two air-dump hopper cars, two boxcars and tanker with them.

Former motive power and rolling stock
 Engine 1518, a GE 95 ton locomotive built in 1956. The engine was donated by Praxair Inc. of Tonawanda, New York. This engine has since been scrapped as restoration was not feasible.
 Engine 1556, a GE 70 ton locomotive built in 1950 for the Pacific Great Eastern Railway as 556. Has been returned to active freight service as of July 2018

Restoration shop
A restoration and repair shop in the Village of St. Jacobs was completed in mid-2010.

See also

 Waterloo – St. Jacobs Railway
 Waterloo Junction Railway
 List of Ontario railways

References

External links

Heritage railways in Ontario
Passenger rail transport in Waterloo, Ontario
Rail transport in Woolwich, Ontario
Standard gauge railways in Canada